Kazakhstan competed at the 2004 Summer Paralympics in Athens, Greece. The team included 8 athletes, 6 men and 2 women, but won no medals.

Sports

Athletics

Men's track

Men's field

Women's track

Powerlifting

Swimming

See also
Kazakhstan at the Paralympics
Kazakhstan at the 2004 Summer Olympics

References 

Nations at the 2004 Summer Paralympics
2004
Summer Paralympics